Azalia may refer to:

 Azalia, Indiana, United States
 Azalia, Michigan, United States
 Azalia Snail, musician
 Intel High Definition Audio, by codename
 A brand name of desogestrel

See also
 Azala (disambiguation)
 Azalea (disambiguation)